Kunwar Multana Singh Bahadur, sometimes styled as Shahzada (1819 - 1846) was the son of Ranjit Singh, Maharaja of Sikh Empire and Rani Ratan Kaur. 

He was said to be the son of a Muslim slave girl in the household of Maharani Datar Kaur , by an attendant in the zenana. He was procured by Ratan Kaur and presented to and accepted by Ranjit Singh as her son.  He married Bakhtawar Kaur and had three sons: Kishan Singh, Keshra Singh, Arjan Singh. Sardar Arjan Singh served as a munsif in Punjab for many years. Multana Singh died in 1846.

Note

Sikh Empire
1819 births
1846 deaths
Punjabi people